Goran Karadžić (born December 22, 1974) is a Serbian hotel manager and former professional basketball player.

Playing career 
Karadžić played for the Crvena zvezda of the Yugoslav League. In the 1993–94 season, he won the Yugoslav League with Zvezda and played together with Dragoljub Vidačić, Ivica Mavrenski, Saša Obradović, Mileta Lisica, Aleksandar Trifunović, and Dejan Tomašević.

In 1998, he went abroad. During next couple of years he played in Poland (Polonia and Zepter Śląsk), Germany (TSK uniVersa Bamberg and Bayer Giants Leverkusen), and Portugal (Casino Ginásio).

National team career 
Karadžić was a member of the FR Yugoslavia national under-22 team that won the bronze medal at the 1996 European Championship for 22 and Under in Turkey. Over five tournament games, he averaged 4.0 points, 2.2 rebounds and 0.8 assists per game.

Career achievements 
 Yugoslav League champion: 1 (with Crvena zvezda: 1993–94)
 Portuguese Basketball Champions Tournament winner: 1 (with Casino Ginásio: 2003–04)
 Yugoslav Super Cup winner: 1 (with Crvena zvezda: 1993)

Post-playing career 
Karadžić has been a general manager of the Stara Planina Resort since November 2015. Also, he has been the deputy general manager of the Slavija Hotels since June 2014.

References

External links
 Goran Karadzic at LinkedIn
 Player Profile at eurobasket.com
 Player Profile at fibaeurope.com

1974 births
Living people
Basketball players from Belgrade
Bayer Giants Leverkusen players
Brose Bamberg players
Hotel executives
KK Crvena zvezda players
Businesspeople from Belgrade
Serbian expatriate basketball people in Germany
Serbian expatriate basketball people in Poland
Serbian expatriate basketball people in Portugal
Serbian men's basketball players
Shooting guards
Śląsk Wrocław basketball players
Small forwards
Yugoslav men's basketball players